Lucca Borges de Brito (born 14 February 1990), simply known as Lucca, is a Brazilian professional footballer who plays as a winger for Thai League 1 club
Lamphun Warriors. Lucca is known for his playmaking ability, his excellent technical ability, vision and set pieces.

Club career
On 15 September 2015, he was loaned to Corinthians until the end of May 2016. He was signed definitively on 10 May 2016 for an undisclosed fee (rumored to be around R$4,5 million).

Career statistics

Honours
Palmas
Campeonato Tocantinense: 2007

Cruzeiro
Campeonato Brasileiro Série A: 2013

Corinthians
Campeonato Brasileiro Série A: 2015
Campeonato Paulista: 2018

References

1990 births
Living people
Sportspeople from Maranhão
Brazilian footballers
Association football wingers
Association football forwards
Campeonato Brasileiro Série A players
Campeonato Brasileiro Série B players
Campeonato Brasileiro Série C players
Qatar Stars League players
Palmas Futebol e Regatas players
Boa Esporte Clube players
Criciúma Esporte Clube players
Associação Chapecoense de Futebol players
Cruzeiro Esporte Clube players
Sport Club Corinthians Paulista players
Esporte Clube Bahia players
Al-Rayyan SC players
Al-Khor SC players
Fluminense FC players
Lamphun Warriors F.C. players
Brazilian expatriate sportspeople in Qatar
Expatriate footballers in Qatar